Zieria montana is a plant in the citrus family Rutaceae and is endemic to a small area in south-east Queensland. It is a shrub with rough, ridged branches, leaves composed of three leaflets and groups of white, four-petalled flowers in spring and early summer.

Description
The leaflets are glabrous except for a few scattered hairs on the lower side along the mid-vein.

The flowers are white, tinged with pink and are arranged in upper leaf axils in groups of 10 to 20. In common with other zierias, there are only four stamens. Flowering occurs from September to December.

Taxonomy and naming
Zieria montana was first formally described in 2002 by James Armstrong and the description was published in Australian Systematic Botany. The specific epithet (montana) is a Latin word meaning "of mountains".

Distribution and habitat
This zieria occurs in the Mount Barney National Park area, growing in heath near rocky outcrops.

Conservation
Zieria montana is listed as "Vulnerable" under the Queensland Nature Conservation Act 1992. The main threats to its survival are too-frequent fires and trampling by walkers.

References

montana
Sapindales of Australia
Flora of New South Wales
Plants described in 2002